The Restoring Healthy Forests for Healthy Communities Act is a bill that was introduced in the United States House of Representatives during the 113th United States Congress.  The Restoring Healthy Forests for Healthy Communities Act would direct the United States Department of Agriculture to establish at least one Forest Reserve Revenue Area within each unit of the National Forest System designated for sustainable forest management for the production of national forest materials (the sale of trees, portions of trees, or forest products from System lands) and forest reserve revenues (to be derived from the sale of such materials in such an Area).  The bill then states that the purpose of an Area is to provide a dependable source of 25% payments and economic activity for each beneficiary county containing System land that was eligible to receive payments through its state under the Secure Rural Schools and Community Self-Determination Act of 2000.

Provisions of the bill
This summary is based largely on the summary provided by the Congressional Research Service, a public domain source.

The Restoring Healthy Forests for Healthy Communities Act would direct the Secretary of Agriculture (USDA) to establish at least one Forest Reserve Revenue Area within each unit of the National Forest System designated for sustainable forest management for the production of national forest materials (the sale of trees, portions of trees, or forest products from System lands) and forest reserve revenues (to be derived from the sale of such materials in such an Area).  The bill then states that the purpose of an Area is to provide a dependable source of 25% payments and economic activity for each beneficiary county containing System land that was eligible to receive payments through its state under the Secure Rural Schools and Community Self-Determination Act of 2000.

The bill would instruct the Secretary of Agriculture to: (1) manage Areas in the manner necessary to achieve their annual volume requirement, and (2) conduct covered forest reserve projects within those Areas in accordance with this Act. It also would define "annual volume requirement" and "covered forest reserve project."

The Restoring Healthy Forests for Healthy Communities Act would require a covered project to be implemented consistent with the land and resource management plan for the System unit in which the project will be carried out.  Finally, the bill would require forest reserve revenues to be used to make: (1) deposits into the Knutson-Vandenburg Fund and the salvage sale fund in contributions equal to the monies collected under such Acts for projects conducted on System land, and (2) 25% payments to states for the benefit of public schools and public roads of beneficiary counties.

Procedural history

House
The Restoring Healthy Forests for Healthy Communities Act was introduced into the House on April 12, 2013 by Rep. Doc Hastings (R, WA-4).  It was referred to the United States House Committee on Agriculture, the United States House Committee on Natural Resources, the United States House Agriculture Subcommittee on Conservation, Energy, and Forestry, and the United States House Natural Resources Subcommittee on Public Lands and Environmental Regulation.  The House Majority Leader Eric Cantor placed the bill on the House Schedule on September 13, 2013 for consideration under a suspension of the rules on September 17.

Debate and discussion
Supporters of the bill argued that the "failure to harvest enough timber is leaving fuel in forests that is leading to larger wildfires."

See also
 List of bills in the 113th United States Congress
 United States Forest Service

References

External links

 Library of Congress – Thomas H.R. 1526
 beta.congress.gov H.R. 1526
 GovTrack.us H.R. 1526
 OpenCongress.org H.R. 1526
 WashingtonWatch.com H.R. 1526

Proposed legislation of the 113th United States Congress
United States Forest Service
Nature conservation in the United States